Spassky District is an administrative district (raion), one of the forty in Nizhny Novgorod Oblast, Russia. Municipally, it is incorporated as Spassky Municipal District. It is located in the east of the oblast. Its administrative center is the rural locality (a selo) of Spasskoye. Population: 10,998 (2010 Census);  The population of Spasskoye accounts for 35.9% of the district's total population.

History
The district was established in 1929.

References

Notes

Sources

Districts of Nizhny Novgorod Oblast
States and territories established in 1929
 
